Casa Publicadora das Assembléias de Deus (CPAD; Portuguese: Publishing House of the Assemblies of God) is a  Brazilian Christian publishing house.  Its activities officially began in March 1940, when it gave its legal organization in the city of Rio de Janeiro. It is an administrative organ and linked ministerially to the General Convention of the Assemblies of God in Brazil (CGADB), currently being chaired by pastor José Wellington Bezerra da Costa. The Board of directors the company is chaired by José Wellington Costa Junior and executive management by Ronaldo Rodrigues.

References

External links
 Site official

Assemblies of God
Publishing companies of Brazil
Pentecostalism in South America